Đa Phước may refer to several rural communes in Vietnam, including:

Đa Phước, Ho Chi Minh City, a commune of Bình Chánh District
Đa Phước, An Giang, a commune of An Phú District

See also
Đa Phúc